1 Peter 2 is the second chapter of the First Epistle of Peter in the New Testament of the Christian Bible. The author identifies himself as "Peter, an apostle of Jesus Christ" and the epistle is traditionally attributed to Peter the Apostle, but some writers argue that it is the work of Peter's followers in Rome between 70 and 100 CE.

Text
The original text was written in Koine Greek. This chapter is divided into 25 verses.

Textual witnesses
Some early manuscripts containing the text of this chapter are:
In Greek
Papyrus 72 (3rd/4th century)
Papyrus 125 (3rd/4th century; extant verses 1–5, 7–12)
Papyrus 81 (4th century; extant verses 20–25)
Codex Vaticanus (325–350)
Codex Sinaiticus (330–360)
Codex Alexandrinus (400–440)
Codex Ephraemi Rescriptus (ca. 450; complete)
Papyrus 74 (7th century; extant verses 6–7, 11–12, 18, 24)
In Latin
León palimpsest (7th century; complete)

Old Testament references 
 : Psalm .
 1 Peter 2:6: 
 1 Peter 2:7: Psalm 118:22
 1 Peter 2:8: Isaiah 8:14
 :

Rebirth through the Word (1:22–2:3)

Verse 1

The admonition which starts here "stands, as οὖν (oun, "therefore") shows, in close connection with what precedes in ": Since you have purified your souls in obeying the truth….

Verse 2

The NU text reads "grow up to salvation".

God's chosen people (2:4–10)

Verse 6
Therefore it is also contained in the Scripture,
"Behold, I lay in Zion
 A chief cornerstone, elect, precious,
 And he who believes on Him will by no means be put to shame."
Citing Isaiah 28:16
Cross reference: Romans 9:33, Ephesians 2:20

Verse 7
Therefore, to you who believe, He is precious; but to those who are disobedient,"The stone which the builders rejectedHas become the chief cornerstone,"Citing Psalm 118:22

Verse 8and"A stone of stumblingAnd a rock of offense."They stumble, being disobedient to the word, to which they also were appointed.Citing Isaiah 8:14, Isaiah 28:16

Verse 9But you are a chosen generation, a royal priesthood, a holy nation, His own special people, that you may proclaim the praises of Him who called you out of darkness into His marvelous light;Citing: ;  (LXX); Isaiah 43:20-21; 62:12 and Malachi 3:17.Note on 1 Peter 2:9 in NET Bible
Revelation 1:6), meaning that 'in God's organised kingdom, every member is a priest'.

Principles of conduct in human society (2:11–17)
This section addresses the distinctness of the believers' communities which is preserved when their conduct is good by God's standards.

The principles in practice (2:18–25)
Slaves, and also wives in the next chapter, were two vulnerable groups. Commentator Eric Eve suggests that the advice directly concerns their welfare, but it is also indirectly employed to offer examples of proper submission for Christians.

See also
Priesthood
Priesthood of all believers
Jesus Christ
Related Bible parts: Psalm 118, Isaiah 8, Isaiah 28, Isaiah 53, Isaiah 62, Malachi 3, Matthew 8, Romans 3, Romans 9

References

Bibliography

External links
 King James Bible - Wikisource
English Translation with Parallel Latin Vulgate
Online Bible at GospelHall.org (ESV, KJV, Darby, American Standard Version, Bible in Basic English)
Multiple bible versions at Bible Gateway (NKJV, NIV, NRSV etc.)

 
1 Peter 2